The Final Five was the United States women's team in artistic gymnastics that won the team event at the 2016 Summer Olympics in Rio de Janeiro. It was the United States' third gold medal in the event and second outside the United States. The five members of the team were Simone Biles, Gabby Douglas, Laurie Hernandez, Madison Kocian, and Aly Raisman, with MyKayla Skinner, Ragan Smith, and Ashton Locklear serving as the three alternates. After the team event, Biles won a gold medal in the individual all-around event, the vault, and on floor exercise and won a bronze on the balance beam, while Raisman won silver medals in the individual all-around, and on the floor exercise, where she was the defending champion, Hernandez won silver on the balance beam, and Kocian won a silver in the uneven bars. The previous team to medal in every event, including the team and individual all-around, was the Unified Team at the 1992 Games; the only previous U.S. team to do so was at the 1984 Games.

Team background
Raisman and Douglas were both part of the gold medal winning team, dubbed the Fierce Five, at the 2012 London Olympics where Douglas won gold in the all-around and Raisman won gold on the floor event and bronze on the balance beam.

Biles won gold at the 2013 World Championships in the individual all-around and on floor exercise.  She also won silver on vault and bronze on balance beam.

Biles and Kocian were part of the 2014 World Championship gold medal winning team.  Biles additionally won gold in the all-around, on floor exercise, and on balance beam. She also won silver on vault.

Biles, Raisman, Douglas, and Kocian were all part of the 2015 World Championship gold medal winning team.  Biles won gold in the all-around and Douglas won the silver. Biles also won gold on floor exercise and balance beam and won bronze on the vault.  Kocian won gold on the uneven bars in a four way tie.  Thus making Biles the reigning world champion in all-around, floor, and balance beam and Kocian the reigning world co-champion on the uneven bars going into the Olympics.  Additionally Biles was the reigning national champion as well.

Aly Raisman, the captain of the Fierce Five, was once again selected as team captain.

Biles was chosen by Team USA to be the flag bearer for the closing ceremonies. She was the first American female gymnast to be given the honor.

Olympic Trials

The Women's Gymnastics Olympic Trials took place on Friday, July 8 and Sunday, July 10, 2016 at the SAP Center in San Jose, California.

At the 2016 U.S. Olympic Trials, Biles, Hernandez, and Raisman finished first, second, and third respectively in the all-around competition. Biles finished first on vault and floor exercise, Kocian finished first on the uneven bars, Hernandez finished first on the balance beam. MyKayla Skinner, Ragan Smith, and Ashton Locklear were selected as the three alternates.  Full Olympic Trial scores are as follows:

Nickname
The name Final Five was chosen by the team members. At the 2012 London Games, the team had adopted the nickname "Fierce Five" in response to the media-bestowed nickname "Fab Five". The 2016 nickname was not announced until the team had secured victory in the team event.  The name has two meanings: one being that this is the last Olympics where gymnastics teams will be made up of five members (starting in 2020 teams will consist of only four) and the other being that it was the final gymnastics team to be formed under Marta Karolyi as national team coordinator of USA Gymnastics.

2016 Summer Olympics

Qualifications
The United States qualified in first place with an overall score of 185.238, nearly 10 points ahead of second place China who received a score of 175.279. Biles, Douglas, and Raisman competed on all four events. Hernandez competed on vault, balance beam, and floor exercise. Kocian competed only on uneven bars. For the individual all-around competition, Biles, Raisman, and Douglas qualified in first, second, and third place, respectively. Due to the rule allowing only the top two from each country to compete in a World or Olympic individual final, only Biles and Raisman advanced. Douglas had won the all-around at the 2012 London Olympics.

Biles qualified first on the vault, balance beam, and floor exercise; Kocian qualified first on the uneven bars; Raisman qualified second on the floor exercise; Hernandez qualified second on the balance beam; Douglas qualified third on the uneven bars.  Additionally Douglas and Raisman both finished seventh on the balance beam; Hernandez finished fourth and Douglas finished ninth on floor exercise, but both failed to qualify to the finals due to the two per country rule.

Team Final

Biles, Raisman, and Hernandez each competed on vault, balance beam, and floor exercise.  Kocian, Douglas, and Biles competed on uneven bars. The team scored 184.897, over eight points ahead of second place Russia.  For each individual apparatus, the Final Five's combined scores were the highest.

Individual Events

In the individual all-around, Biles and Raisman each performed four clean routines, with Biles scoring the highest score on all but the uneven bars, as well as being the only gymnast that day to score above 15 on the balance beam. Biles took the gold medal, 2.1 points ahead of Raisman, who took the silver medal. With this, Biles and Raisman became the second pair of American gymnasts to go 1-2 in the individual all-around in the Olympics, after Nastia Liukin and Shawn Johnson took gold and silver respectively in 2008 in Beijing.

In the vault final, Biles, who was favored to win despite never winning a world title on the apparatus, won the gold medal, becoming the first American gymnast to win the vault title at an Olympic Games.

After qualifying in 1st, Kocian performed cleanly and won the silver medal on uneven bars, finishing behind Russian gymnast and reigning Olympic uneven bars champion Aliya Mustafina. Douglas, who qualified in 3rd behind Kocian and Mustafina, respectively, made a mistake on one of her pirouettes and placed seventh.

In the balance beam final, Hernandez won the silver medal, finishing behind the Netherlands' Sanne Wevers.  Biles suffered a shocking mishap when she put her hands on the beam after a balance check on her front tuck. Despite the mistake, her score was high enough to win her the bronze medal.

Copying the results of the individual all-around, Biles and Raisman won gold and silver respectively in the floor exercise event final, competing the two highest difficulty routines in the competition.

Post-Olympics
Laurie Hernandez competed on and won season 23 of Dancing with the Stars.  She was partnered with Valentin Chmerkovskiy.

Simone Biles competed on season 24 of Dancing with the Stars. She was partnered with Sasha Farber.  They finished fourth. Farber later helped choreograph a floor exercise routine that Biles debuted in the 2021 U.S. Classic.

Madison Kocian went on to compete at the collegiate level for the UCLA Bruins. She, along with Fierce Five member Kyla Ross, made history by becoming the first Olympic gold medalists to compete in NCAA gymnastics in a team managed and then later assistant coached by another Fierce Five member, Jordyn Wieber.

After the Olympics, it came to light that all five of the Final Five, plus at least one of the three alternates, had been abused sexually, verbally, and/or emotionally while training in gymnastics. The prevalence of abuse in gymnastics was widely discussed in the media after the USA Gymnastics sex abuse scandal became public.

Gallery

See also

 Magnificent Seven, the U.S. 1996 Summer Olympics women's artistic gymnastics team
Fierce Five, the U.S. 2012 Summer Olympics women's artistic gymnastics team

References

+
Nicknamed groups of Olympic competitors
+
Women's gymnastics
Women's sports in the United States
Gymnastics in the United States